Arielle North Olson is an author of children's books.

Family
Arielle is the daughter of noted author Sterling North, who wrote Rascal. She is also the niece of author, poet and editor Jessica Nelson North. She is one of the copyright owners of Sterling North's body of work. She now has three children and seven grandchildren, and is a resident of St. Louis, Missouri.

Arielle is from a multi-generation literary family.  Arielle's great-grandparents, James Hervey Nelson and Sarah Orelup Nelson, were Wisconsin pioneers. In 1917, which would have been her great-grandfather James Hervey Nelson's 100th birthday, three of her great-uncles, including early Amazon missionary Justus Henry Nelson, wrote extended biographies about their parents and their pioneer farm life. These writing efforts may have been a literary inspiration to both her father Sterling and her aunt Jessica.

Writing career
Arielle has written:
 Hurry Home Grandma
 Noah's Cats and the Devil's Fire
 The Lighthouse Keeper's Daughter

She has edited:
 Ask the Bones: Scary Stories from Around the World
 More Bones: Scary Stories From Around The World
She also reviewed children's books for the St. Louis Post Dispatch for 26 years.

Her biography is captured in:
 Contemporary Authors

References

External links
 Missouri authors
 Mention of her in article about St. Louis' literary legacy
 Article about the Centennial Celebration and the naming of Edgerton as "Booktown"
 Agenda of the Centennial celebration mentioning her as starting the Opening Ceremony
 Sterling North Society newsletter mentioning her several times.
 Short bio of her in the Edgerton Bookfest notes

20th-century American novelists
21st-century American novelists
American children's writers
American women novelists
Novelists from Missouri
Novelists from Wisconsin
Living people
American women children's writers
20th-century American women writers
21st-century American women writers
Writers from St. Louis
Year of birth missing (living people)